Oghuz District is one of the 66 districts of Azerbaijan. It is located in the north of the country and belongs to the Shaki-Zagatala Economic Region. The district borders the districts of Shaki, Qabala, Agdash, and the Russian Republic of Dagestan. Its capital and largest city is Oghuz. As of 2020, the district had a population of 44,700.

Location 
Oghuz District is located on the southern slopes of the Greater Caucasus. The highest point of the region is Malkamud Mount (3879 m). It is the border with the Russian Federation in the north, with Qabala in the east, Shaki in the west, and with Agdash in the south.

History 
The remains of a prehistoric man were found near the villages of Kerimli and Garabaghlar, based on the results of archaeological excavations. Stone figurines, various tools, and household items were found here.

The district was part of the Ganja Province, which existed from April 3, 1952, until April 23, 1953. This province was abolished by the decision of the Supreme Soviet of the USSR dated April 23, 1953. Administrative-territorial reforms were carried out in 1962–1964 in connection with the establishment of the agricultural department and the establishment of national economical boards in the territory of the USSR. As a result, industrial and agricultural districts were established on the basis of the large districts. On January 4, 1963, 31 districts and 7 cities were established in the Azerbaijan SSR in the territory of six towns with 50 districts. According to this decision, the city of Nukha (Shaki since 1968) was established and the villages of the district are included in the Vartashen district (which would later become Oghuz District). This reform was cancelled on January 6, 1965, due to inefficiency. For this reason, villages included in the Vartashen district were subordinated to Nukha. Until 1961, Vartashen village was the centre of the Vartashan district. According to the decision of the Supreme Soviet of the Azerbaijan SSR, the name of Vartashan was renamed Oghuz in February 1991.

Population 
According to the report of the State Statistics Committee, the total number of population in 2010 was 37,000. In 2018, this indicator increased by 7,000 people.

Ethnic Groups

Monuments 
There are 27 clubs including 1 district, 3 rural culture houses, Central Election Committee and its 31 branches, regional History-Ethnography Museum, H.Aliyev museum, children's music school, cultural park in Oghuz district. There are 39 historical and cultural monuments in the region, of which 32 were registered and taken under state protection, as well as included in the list of historical and cultural monuments approved by the decree of the Cabinet of Ministers of the Republic of Azerbaijan on August 2, 2001. 17 of these monuments (of which 15 are archaeological, 2 are sculptural) are of national importance, and 15 (of which 13 are sculptural, 2 are archaeological) are of local importance.

References

 
Districts of Azerbaijan